Suchha Singh (born 21 July 1933) is a former Indian cyclist. He competed in the sprint at the 1964 Summer Olympics.

References

External links
 

1933 births
Living people
Indian male cyclists
Olympic cyclists of India
Cyclists at the 1964 Summer Olympics
Place of birth missing (living people)